The McNeese State Cowboys baseball team is a varsity intercollegiate athletic team of McNeese State University in Lake Charles, Louisiana, United States. The team is a member of the Southland Conference, which is part of the National Collegiate Athletic Association's Division I. The team plays its home games at Joe Miller Ballpark in Lake Charles, Louisiana. The Cowboys are coached by Justin Hill.

Head coaches

Year-by-year results

NCAA Regional appearances

Major League Baseball
McNeese State has had 48 Major League Baseball Draft selections since the draft began in 1965.

See also
List of NCAA Division I baseball programs

References

External links